Tottenham High Cross was erected in Tottenham sometime between 1600 and 1609 by Owen Wood, Dean of Armagh, on the site of a wooden wayside cross first mentioned in 1409, and marks what was the centre of Tottenham Village. There is some speculation that the first structure on the site was a Roman beacon or marker , situated on a low summit on Ermine Street, which became the Tottenham High Road, as it is now known.

The high cross was constructed of plain brick, in an octagonal, four level design, which was later stuccoed and ornamented in the Gothic style in 1809.

Tottenham High Cross is often mistakenly thought to be an Eleanor cross, possibly because it is only a few miles south of one of the true Eleanor crosses at Waltham Cross.

See also
 List of public art in Haringey

References
 Tottenham: Growth before 1850, A History of the County of Middlesex: Volume 5: Hendon, Kingsbury, Great Stanmore, Little Stanmore, Edmonton Enfield, Monken Hadley, South Mimms, Tottenham (1976), pp. 313-17

Buildings and structures completed in 1609
Towers completed in the 17th century
Buildings and structures in the London Borough of Haringey
Monuments and memorials in London
Tourist attractions in the London Borough of Haringey
High crosses in England
Monumental crosses in England
High Cross